The Nightmare Returns is a live concert video of Alice Cooper.

The concert was filmed live in Detroit, Michigan, USA on Halloween 1986 at the start of his "The Nightmare Returns" World Tour, in support of his album Constrictor.

This video was originally released in 1987 on VHS and Betamax, and was released on DVD in 2006.

The music video for "Teenage Frankenstein" consists of footage from this concert.

Track listing
"Welcome to My Nightmare"
"Billion Dollar Babies"
"No More Mr. Nice Guy"
"Be My Lover"
"18 (Little Flower of Ulysses)"
"The World Needs Guts"
"Give It Up"
"Cold Ethyl"
"Only Women Bleed"
"Go to Hell"
"The Ballad of Dwight Fry"
"Teenage Frankenstein"
"Sick Things"
"I Love The Dead"
"School's Out"
"Elected"
"Under My Wheels"

Bonus music videos
"Teenage Frankenstein"
"Freedom"

Personnel
Alice Cooper - vocals
Kane Roberts - lead guitar
Devlin 7 - rhythm guitar
Kip Winger - bass (credited as "Kip Winger III")
Ken Mary - drums
Paul Horowitz - keyboards

Alice Cooper
Live video albums
1987 live albums
1987 video albums